Ambrogio Calepino (Latin: Ambrosius Calepinus; c. 1440–1510), commonly known by the Latin form of his name, Calepinus, was an Italian lexicographer.

Calepino was born in Castelli Calepio and died in Bergamo. He entered the Augustinian Order in 1458.

Works
His Latin dictionary appeared first in 1502 at Reggio. It was reprinted many times during the 16th century, the Aldine press alone producing no fewer than 18 editions from 1542 to 1592. Later editions were considerably enlarged. To the Latin of the original were added equivalents in other languages. Thus we have the Basel edition (1590) which contains eleven languages: "Ambrosii Calepini dictionarium undecim linguarum: respondent autem latinis vocabulis hebraica, græca, gallica, italica, germanica, belgica, hispanica, polonica, ungarica, anglica".

The edition in seven languages by Jacopo Facciolati (Pavia, 1718) with the assistance of Egidio Forcellini, was reprinted many times. Calepinus became a common name, a synonym of dictionary or lexicon, and we find titles like the following:  Septem linguarum calepinus, hoc est, lexicon latinum. Calepino also wrote the life of John Bonus of Mantua which is found in the Acta Sanctorum for 22 October (Oct. IX, 748–767).

Notes

References

Augustinian friars
Italian lexicographers
Italian Latinists
1450s births
1510 deaths
Writers from Bergamo